Saucier is a surname. Notable people with the surname include:

Aldric Saucier (1936–2016), American scientist and whistleblower
Billy Jack Saucier (1931–1987), American fiddler
Frank Saucier (born 1926), American baseball player
Gerard Saucier, American academic and psychologist
Guylaine Saucier (born 1946), American businesswoman
Jocelyne Saucier (born 1948), Canadian journalist and novelist
Kevin Saucier (born 1956), American baseball player
Kristian Saucier (born c. 1987), American sailor 
Linda Phillips Gilbert Saucier (born 1948), American mathematician and textbook author
Robert Saucier (born 1955), American politician

Occupational surnames